Micu is a Romanian surname. Notable people with the surname include:

Alexandra Micu, Romanian fashion model
Ana Maria Micu (born 1979), Romanian visual artist 

Romanian-language surnames